General elections were held in Japan on 16 December 2012. Voters gave the Liberal Democratic Party a landslide victory, ejecting the Democratic Party from power after three years. It was the fourth worst defeat suffered by a ruling party in Japanese history.

Voting took place in all representatives' constituencies of Japan including proportional blocks, in order to appoint Members of Diet to seats in the House of Representatives, the lower house of the National Diet of Japan.

In July 2012, it was reported that the deputy prime minister Katsuya Okada had approached the Liberal Democratic Party to sound them out about dissolving the house of representatives and holding the election in January 2013. An agreement was reached in August to dissolve the Diet and hold early elections "shortly" following the passage of a bill to raise the national consumption tax. Some right-wing observers asserted that as the result of introducing the consumption tax to repay the Japanese public debt, the DPJ lost around 75% of its pre-election seats.

Background
The LDP had governed Japan for all but three years since 1955.  However, in the 2009 election, the LDP suffered the worst defeat of a sitting government in modern Japanese history. Due to the characteristics of the Japanese election system, DPJ candidates won 308 seats in the House of Representatives (64.2% of seats), enabling Yukio Hatoyama to become prime minister. Since then, Japan has had two other prime ministers, Naoto Kan and Yoshihiko Noda. On 16 November, Noda dissolved parliament, thus allowing for a new election in a month's time. He cited the lack of funds to carry on the functions of government and the need for an emergency budget.

Dissatisfaction with the DPJ-led government and the former LDP-led government led to the formation of several grassroots movements, collectively known as the "third pole," to counter the two major parties. The former Governor of Tokyo Shintarō Ishihara announced the renamed and re-formed of the Sunrise Party on 14 November 2012 Ishihara co-leading with Takeo Hiranuma. On 17 November 2012 Mayor of Osaka Tōru Hashimoto and former Tokyo Governor Shintarō Ishihara announced the merger of the Japan Restoration Party and the Sunrise Party as a third force to contend the 16 December 2012 general election. It is Japan's first national political party that is based outside of Tokyo.

On 23 November, Mayor of Nagoya Takashi Kawamura, former state minister Shizuka Kamei and former farm minister Masahiko Yamada joined forces together to launch Tax Cuts Japan – Oppose TPP – Zero Nuclear Party as another "third pole" national political party. On 28 November, the Governor of Shiga Yukiko Kada in Ōtsu announced the establishment of an anti-nuclear and equal gender party known as the Tomorrow Party of Japan becoming the second national party based outside of Tokyo. Concurrent the DPJ splitter group, People's Life First president Ichirō Ozawa dissolved the party and merged into the Tomorrow Party. Tax Cuts Japan – Oppose TPP – Zero Nuclear Party and Japan Future Party are negotiating to merge parties to further counter the major parties and the pro-nuclear parties. On 27 November Tax Cuts Japan – Oppose TPP – Zero Nuclear Party officially announced they would merge with Tomorrow, with party co-leader Mashahiko Yamada saying "We would also like to raise our hands in joining because our ways of thinking are the same."

Opinion polls

Party polling for the 180 proportional seats

PM polling

Pre-election composition 
As of official announcement (kōji [=deadline for candidate registration, legal campaign start, start of early voting on following day]) on 4 December – note that the government had lost its majority, already slim at the time of dissolution of the House of Representatives (16 November), due to further defections during the positioning of candidates for the election.

Results

By prefecture

By PR block

Representatives

Members of House of Representatives elected from single-seat constituency

Aftermath
As the Liberal Democratic Party (LDP) won 294 seats and their allies the New Komeito Party won 31 seats, a coalition of the two parties would be able to form a two-thirds majority in the House of Representatives, enabling them to overrule the House of Councillors. The significant swing back towards conservative politics was attributed to economic anxieties, including fear of falling behind China. Despite this landslide victory, Shinzo Abe acknowledged that his party won mainly because of voter antipathy towards the Democratic Party and not due to a resurgence in popularity for the LDP.

On the other hand, the election was an unmitigated disaster for the Democratic Party, which lost three-quarters of its 230 seats in the lower house to finish with just 57.  In addition, seven members of the Cabinet lost their seats, the most ever in an election.  Naoto Kan, who preceded Noda as prime minister, lost his constituency as well. Overall, this marked the worst performance by a ruling party in the post-World War II era.  As a result, Yoshihiko Noda resigned from his post as party president.

The Tomorrow Party of Japan, which formed shortly before the election, consisted mostly of incumbents defecting from the Democratic Party. Most of these incumbents were unseated, causing the party to lose 86% of its strength only weeks after forming. Both the Japan Restoration Party and Your Party emerged as viable players in the Diet, while the traditional left parties Social Democratic Party and Japanese Communist Party continued to decline in strength and relevance.

The voter turnout of 59.3% was the lowest since the Second World War.

Reactions and analysis
The Liberal Democratic Party had campaigned on a tough stance on the Senkaku Islands dispute, leading to speculation as to how the new government would deal with the issue. Abe made his party's position clear immediately following the election, stating that their "objective is to stop the challenge" from China with regards to ownership of the islands. The re-election of the liberal conservative LDP has raised concern in foreign media that Japan's relations with its neighbours – China and South Korea — will become strained, given the past visits to the Yasukuni Shrine by LDP prime ministers, the party's perceived de-emphasization of Japan's war crimes committed during the Second World War and their intention to amend the country's pacifist constitution to give more power to the Self-Defense Forces. Abe is also in favour of retaining nuclear energy in the country.

In response to the election, the Nikkei 225 Index increased by 1%, while the yen fell to ¥84.48 against the US dollar, the lowest rate in 20 months. Furthermore, the yield on 20-year Japanese government bonds (JCBs) rose to 1.710% a day after the election.  This marked its highest level in nearly eight months.

United States President Barack Obama spoke to Abe by telephone to congratulate him on the results of the general election, and discussed ongoing efforts to enhance bilateral security cooperation as well as deepening economic ties.

Voiding of election
On 25 March 2013 the Hiroshima High Court ruled the election unconstitutional and the results void due to "the disparity in the value of one vote", which was up to 2.43 time the maximum constitutionally allowed disparity in some districts. The decision is expected to be appealed to the Supreme Court, and, if it's upheld, new elections must be held. The Supreme Court had previously ruled that the electoral system was unconstitutional without invalidating election results. Foreign Minister Fumio Kishida said that government would give electoral reform new thought and examine the situation carefully in order to respond in the appropriate manner.

See also
List of Districts of the House of Representatives of Japan

References

External links
Election results (NHK World)
Detailed results (Yomiuri Shimbun) (Japanese)

Japan
General elections in Japan
General election
December 2012 events in Japan